Goluwala is a city in Hanumangarh district of Rajasthan, India. It belongs to Bikaner division. It is divided into two suburbs– Niwadan (24JRK) and Sihagan (22JRK). It is an industrial town located some 31  km west of Hanumangarh and around 51 km off to Sri Ganganagar. Total Population of Goluwala Niwadan(24JRK) & Sihagan(22JRK) is 14960 (9753+5207) in 2011 census. Goluwala can be reached from Pilibangan, the nearest railway station. It is 18 km off National Highway 62 (India) (Old numbering NH-15) and 431 km from State capital Jaipur.It is popular as name "Goluwala the Golden City".

In Ancient India The city was under region called Bhatner (alternatively spelled Bhatnair) because it was founded by king Bhupat in 255 AD.It remained in the control of Rajput of Bhati clan and later occupied by Maharaja Soorat Singh of Bikaner.[1] The remains found at Kalibangan[Pilibanga] in 1951 also gave birth to thought that this area was once a part of nearly 5000 years old Indus Valley Civilization.

Goluwala is growing as a valuable industrial town & Grain market of Hanumangarh district. In 1988's Late Mr.Sahiram (Jeldhar) and Late Pandit Kesra Ram Kayal have taken an agitation for fix up the town grain market and them efforts have changed the flora and fauna of the area. The city has been a center of learning in area since early ages.

Education 
The city has been a center of learning in area since early ages. This city has a large proportion of land which is dedicated to educational institutes. There are various Notable educational institutions in city, among them are:

Marudhara College

BR Choudhary College

BR Chaudhary B.ed college

DAV Girls College

Bhagat Singh College for higher education

Swami Vivekanand College for higher education

Area also has school destinations. There are many school in the city, some notable schools among them are:

G.S Academy 

Noble International Academy
                                                                                                                                                        
BPV Career institute for higher education for IIT,PMT,NEET

Jai Maa Durga Computer Classes

Marshal Children Convent School

Saint Kabir Senior Secondary School

LBS Senior Secondary School

Saraswati Senior Secondary School

Royal Kids Paradise

OK children Convent school academy

HR Senior Secondary School

Govt Boys High School

Govt Girls High School

Nehru public secondary school
                                                                                                                                                                                                                                                 
                                                                                                                                                   
 (various primary govt schools)

Apart from school and colleges there are AnganBadi kenders, various play schools and coaching institutes.

Demographics
At the 2011 India census, Goluwala had a population of around 28899. Majority of the population is Hindu,Jain and Sikh. males constituted around 51% of the population and females around 49%. Goluwala had an average literacy rate of around 78.32%, higher than the national average of 73.0%: male literacy is around 85.42%, and female literacy is around 70.42%.The main caste resides here are Hindu, Sikh, Jain.

Language 
Bagri is the major language in Hanumangarh. It is also known as Khichdi language because of having Punjabi words and Haryanvi accent. Punjabi language is also used as a second language of area and as the predominant language in northern areas along the border of Punjab. Hindi is the state language and English is also used among officials and youth.[8]

Climate 
The climate of Goluwala varies to extreme limits. Summer temperature reaches 50° Celsius and winter temperature dips just around 0° Celsius.[2] The average annual rainfall is only 200 mm (7.9 in).[3] Average maximum temperature in summer is around 41.2 °C and average minimum temperature in winter is around 6 °C.

Economy 
The economy of the city is based on grain market & agriculture, its main crops are wheat, mustard and cotton. Other crops are guar, bajra, sugar cane and grams. In recent years, farmers are also diverting towards horticulture. Kinnow(a citrus family fruit or a hybrid citrus fruit from "orange") is a popular horticultural product; other fruits of the citrus family are also grown.

Industries in Goluwala city are based on agriculture and construction sector. Major industries are cotton ginning and pressing factories, mustard oil mills, wheat flour mills and brick stone, Cotton spinning and textile factories have seen high growth in recent times. Most of the factories are located in and around the City.

Shops for grocery, stationary 
& Cattle feed:

1. Sidhu Studio and Printing Press        
2. SARSWAT KIRYANA STORE AND SARSWAT TOUR AND TRAVLLERS 
3. Super Bazaar
4. Sahil & Brothers Cattle feed 
   shop
5. R.K pustak bhandar
6. Mittal Mart

References 

Villages in Hanumangarh district